Heritage objects in South Africa are objects or collections formally declared as such by the South African Heritage Resource Agency in order to control their export. Declaration does not restrict the sale or ownership of the objects.

Archeological and paleontological material and meteorites are exempt from declaration as such objects may not be bought, sold or owned.

With the coming into effect of the National Heritage Resources Act on 1 April 2000, all moveable objects previously declared as national monuments became heritage objects.

Heritage Objects at Provincial Level 

At provincial level only Amafa aKwaZulu-Natali has powers to protect and manage heritage objects.

See also
 National heritage sites (South Africa)
 Provincial heritage site (South Africa)
 South African Heritage Resources Agency
 Amafa aKwaZulu-Natali
 National Monuments Council (South Africa and Namibia)

External links
 Website of the South African Heritage Resource Agency
 Website of Amafa aKwaZulu-Natali
 Searchable database of protected sites, objects and shipwrecks

References

Government of South Africa
Heritage registers in South Africa
South African heritage resources